The Seca Formation is a Late Eocene (Divisaderan to Tinguirirican in the SALMA classification) geologic formation of the Progreso Basin in southwestern Ecuador. The shales of the formation have provided fossils of the marine snake Pterosphenus sheppardi.

Description 
The Seca Formation, part of the Ancón Group, conformably overlies the Socorro Formation and is overlain by the Punta Ancón Formation. The Seca Formation comprises grey to greenish shales deposited in a marine platform with submarine fans environment. The formation is a reservoir rock, and potential source rock, in the oil-rich Progreso Basin.

See also 
 List of fossiliferous stratigraphic units in Ecuador

References

Bibliography

Further reading 
 R. Hoffstetter. 1958. Un serpent marin du genre Pterosphenus (Pt. Sheppardi nov. sp.) dans L’Éocène supérieur de L’Équateur (Amérique de Sud). Bulletin de la Société Géologique de France 6:45-50

Geologic formations of Ecuador
Paleogene Ecuador
Priabonian Stage
Divisaderan
Tinguirirican
Shale formations
Open marine deposits
Reservoir rock formations
Fossiliferous stratigraphic units of South America
Paleontology in Ecuador
Formations